Charles Rouxel (born 6 April 1948) is a French former professional racing cyclist. He rode in six editions of the Tour de France.

References

External links
 

1948 births
Living people
French male cyclists
Sportspeople from Manche
Cyclists from Normandy